The Undanbi are an Aboriginal Australian people of southern Queensland. Alternative or clan names include Inabara, Djindubari  and Ningy Ningy (also spelt Ningyningy and other variants).

Name
The autonym Undanbi is formed from their word for 'man' (dan).

Language
The Undanbi spoke a dialect mutually intelligible with that of the Jagera and Turrbal peoples, and it was apparently the dialect mastered by Tom Petrie.

Country
The Undanbi occupied an estimated  around the coastal strip along Coolum Beach and Moreton Bay, reaching down from Noosa Heads as far south as the estuary of the Brisbane River. They also had a foothold on Bribie Island.

The western neighbours of the coastal Undanbi were the Dalla.

Social organisation
The Undanbi were divided into several groups or clans:
 The Inabara (the furthest north, near Noosa Heads)
 The Djindubari on Bribie Island
 The Ningyningy (southernmost clan, around Toorbul and Redcliffe )

Physically, the Undanbi were known for their impressive builds, which marked them off from members of tribes like the Dalla, who were generally slighter.

The Ningyningy (also spelt Ningy Ningy), the most southerly Undanbi clan, are sometimes given as located also on Bribie Island. The explorer Ludwig Leichhardt, for one, in referring to the Bribie Island aborigines, wrote of them as 'Nynga-Nynga blacks.' Their dialect was called Oondoo, and their ethnonym meant 'oysters' in the Maroochy dialect. They were distinguished from the Djindubari, who used charcoal and bees' wax to blacken themselves, by painting themselves with red ochre clan markings. By the mid 1840s, it is thought that many of the encampments in the Brisbane area arose from the Undanbi remnants of the Ningyningy and Djindubari who mustered there for blanket handouts and became notorious for their pitched battles, with the Turrbal clansmen under Daki Yakka, (known to the whites as the Duke of York).  By the 1850s these northern refugees were thought to be trying to exterminate the Brisbane blacks, and bought the brunt of accusations that the black presence in the area was causing endless trouble.

In colonial tradition they were reputed to be highly aggressive, though they had formerly kept the three castaways Thomas Pamphlett, John Finnegan and Richard Parsons from dying of starvation after they came across them at Clontarf Point, and by treating them hospitably for three months until John Oxley located them.

Their memory is evoked in the present-day place name for the town of Nimbi

History of contact
The Brisbane group of the Undanbi was said to have become extinct within a few decades of white settlement. Archibald Meston stated they had died off by 1860. Other testimony suggests a number were still alive, in 1883, at Mooloolaba.

Words
 tchaceroo(Strepera graculina). Meston identified this as the pied crow shrike, now called the pied currawong, and suggested that this word from the Brisbane Churrabool dialect lies behind the Australian word jackeroo, dating its adoption from the Undambi (Churrabool refers according to Tindale, to them) via the German Lutheran Zion Hill Mission established at Nundah in 1848.

Alternative names

 Bo-oobera
 Churrabool
 Dippil (a generic name for a language applied to Undanbi and also, at time, to the Gabi-Gabi speaking Gubbi Gubbi tribes].
 Djindubari (the horde on Bribie Island)
 Djuadubari, Jooaduburrie
 Mooloola(river name)
 Ninge Ninge
 Nynga-Nynga
 Oondumbi
 Turrubul, Turrbul (language name)
 Undumbi

Source:

Notes

Citations

Sources

Aboriginal peoples of Queensland
Moreton Bay
South East Queensland